Kocalar can refer to:

 Kocalar, Bismil
 Kocalar, Çanakkale
 Kocalar, Kızılcahamam